Douglas S. Coppinger is a United States Air Force major general currently serving as the deputy chief of the Central Security Service. Prior to that, he was the director for intelligence of the U.S. Cyber Command.

References 

 

 

Living people
Year of birth missing (living people)
Place of birth missing (living people)
United States Air Force generals
Brigadier generals